Ohaukwu is a Local Government Area of Ebonyi State, Nigeria.

The postal code of the area is 481.

References

Local Government Areas in Ebonyi State